Uropolystigma is a genus of fungi in the family Phyllachoraceae. This is a monotypic genus, containing the single species Uropolystigma atrotestaceum.

References

External links
Index Fungorum

Phyllachorales
Monotypic Sordariomycetes genera